Atlantic City, New Jersey was incorporated on May 1, 1854. It is governed within the Faulkner Act (formally known as the Optional Municipal Charter Law) under the Mayor-Council system of municipal government (Plan D), implemented by direct petition effective as of July 1, 1982. The City Council is the governing body of Atlantic City. There are nine Council members, who are elected to serve for a term of four years, one from each of six wards and three serving at-large. The City Council exercises the legislative power of the municipality for the purpose of holding Council meetings to introduce ordinances and resolutions to regulate City government. In addition, Council members review budgets submitted by the Mayor; provide for an annual audit of the city's accounts and financial transactions; organize standing committees and hold public hearings to address important issues which impact Atlantic City. Former Mayor Bob Levy created the Atlantic City Ethics Board in 2007, but the Board was dissolved two years later by vote of the Atlantic City Council. Since its incorporation in 1854, the town has had 41 mayors.

Mayors

References

 
Atlantic City
History of Atlantic City, New Jersey